Manueli may refer to:

 Manueli Tulo (born 1990), Fijian weightlifter
 Paul Manueli, former Commander of the Royal Fiji Military Forces
 Cernaysia manueli, commonly known as Manuel's skink, is a species of lizard in the subfamily Scincinae of the family Scincidae
 Chalcides manueli, commonly known as Manuel's skink, is a species of lizard in the subfamily Scincinae of the family Scincidae
 Pholcus manueli, a species of cellar spider in the family Pholcidae

See also 
 Emanueli